"Vas A Querer Volver" is the third single from Mexican singer Maite Perroni, extracted from the deluxe edition and her debut album, "Eclipse de Luna".

The song is the main theme of the Mexican telenovela La Gata, which Perroni was the protagonist. The song was performed for the first time on July 10, 2014 in the official presentation of the telenovela La Gata, however, it was only digitally released on May 27, 2014. The song follows the genre of bachata.

Charts

Awards and nominations

References

2014 songs
2014 singles
Spanish-language songs
Warner Music Group singles